Hightowers is an unincorporated community in Hightowers Township, Caswell County, North Carolina, United States, northwest of Prospect Hill. It is located around the intersection of North Carolina Highway 119, and Nicks Road, a former alignment of Highway 86.

Reedy Fork, a tributary to Hyco Creek, rises here.

References

Unincorporated communities in Caswell County, North Carolina
Unincorporated communities in North Carolina